Awet Tesfaiesus (born 5 October 1974) is a German politician from Alliance 90/The Greens who has served as a member of the Bundestag from the state of Hesse since 2021. Previously a lawyer who represented asylum seekers and refugees, Tesfaiesus was elected as a city councillor for the city of Kassel in 2016. Tesfaiesus was elected in the 2021 German federal election as a member of the Green Party list in the state of Hesse. She is the first black woman to ever be elected to the Bundestag.

Political career
Tesfaiesus has been a member of Alliance 90/The Greens since 2009. After expressing concern over the Alternative for Germany's entry into the Kassel city council as a result of increased anti-immigrant sentiments, she decided to enter municipal politics to become a city councillor. She was elected to Kassel's city council in 2016 and introduced anti-discrimination legislation inspired by her experiences dealing with racism in her daily life. Tesfaiesus cited her experience of being shut out of being offered apartments due to her surname, only to have her German-born husband call and be accepted.

Tesfaiesus also cited the 2020 Hanau shootings, where a far-right extremist engaged in a racially motivated mass shooting in Hesse, her home state, as her reason for entering national politics. She had previously considered withdrawing from the political scene, but was incentivized to step forward in response to the xenophobic attacks.

Tesfaiesus ran as a direct candidate in Werra-Meißner – Hersfeld-Rotenburg constituency in the 2021 federal election and placed fourth. Tesfaiesus' campaign slogan was "courage to change". She was in ninth position on the Greens party list for the state of Hesse, and was elected to the Bundestag. Tesfaiesus became the first black woman elected to the Bundestag in what was a younger and more ethnically diverse Bundestag cohort than previously.

Tesfaiesus aims to remove barriers to naturalization within Germany, including lifting restrictions imposed by the dual citizenship status. Tesfaiesus wished to use her platform to demonstrate to people who did not "look German" that they had a place within Germany's society and political culture.

Other activities
 German Federal Film Board (FFA), Alternate Member of the Supervisory Board (since 2022)

Personal life
Tesfaiesus was born in Asmara, Eritrea (then known as Eritrea Province under Ethiopian rule) in 1974, less than a month after the Derg overthrew the government of the Ethiopian Empire. Her family had sought asylum in Germany to escape political persecution, as her father was sought out by the Ethiopian police due to his support for Eritrean independence.  Her family emigrated to the city of Heidelberg when Tesfaiesus was ten years old. 

Growing up, she failed to see any Afro-German representation on television, with the only exceptions being African Americans while she was watching MTV at 12 in the morning. She received aid from individuals who supported her in her childhood, including teachers and church groups, and she decided to pursue a career which would help repay their efforts. In her everyday life, she experienced individuals who would initially speak to her in English assuming that she was a foreigner. Tesfaiesus eventually was able to become a German citizen, and after contemplating it in 1996, she subsequently accepted the offer. 

Her first name means "victory" in the Tigrinya language. 

Tesfaiesus studied law and moved to Kassel in northern Hesse, where she had lived for the past 20 years. Tesfaiesus primarily focuses on cases pertaining to foreigners and asylum law, and often represents asylum seekers and refugees. 

Tesfaiesus had considered moving to Belgium with her 10-year-old son and husband following the Hanau shootings and the elevated xenophobia which had been the cause for the incident.

See also
Karamba Diaby, previously Germany's only black MP

References

Members of the Bundestag for Hesse
Members of the Bundestag 2021–2025
1974 births
Female members of the Bundestag
Living people
21st-century German women politicians
Members of the Bundestag for Alliance 90/The Greens
German people of Eritrean descent
Naturalized citizens of Germany